Madeleine Daleng (born 30 May 1986, in Oslo) is a Norwegian former competitive figure skater. She is a four-time Norwegian national champion (2003, 2004, 2005, 2006). She placed 25th at the 2002 World Junior Figure Skating Championships.

External links
 Tracings.net profile
 

Norwegian female single skaters
1986 births
Living people
Sportspeople from Oslo
21st-century Norwegian women